Holly fern or hollyfern is a common name for several different species and genera of ferns:

Species
Cyrtomium falcatum in the genus Cyrtomium
Polystichum lonchitis in the genus Polystichum

Genera
Arachniodes
Polystichum